This is a list of electoral division results for the 2019 Australian federal election in the state of Queensland.

Overall results

Results by division

Blair

Bonner

Bowman

Brisbane

Capricornia

Dawson

Dickson

Fadden

Fairfax

Fisher

Flynn

Forde

Griffith

Groom

Herbert

Hinkler

Kennedy

Leichhardt

Lilley

Longman

Maranoa

McPherson

Moncrieff

Moreton

Oxley

Petrie

Rankin

Ryan

Wide Bay

Wright

References

2019 Australian federal election
Queensland 2019